"Sugar Daddy" is a song co-written and recorded by singer Macy Gray. The song was co-written with Meghan Trainor, Bianca Atterberry, Tommy Brown and Thomas Lumpkins. This track appears on the 2018 album Ruby.

Chart performance 
"Sugar Daddy" reached a peak of number 21 on the Billboard Adult R&B Airplay chart for the week of August 8, 2018.

Music video 
The official music video for "Sugar Daddy" stars Macy Gray as a lounge singer, and Evan Ross co-stars as a slick nightclub patron. "Sugar Daddy" was created as a tribute to Billie Holiday biopic Lady Sings the Blues, which stars Diana Ross. It was directed by Christian Lamb and premiered in 2018 on BET Soul and BET Her.

Cast 

 Macy Gray as Lounge Singer
 Evan Ross as Slick Nightclub Patron / Billy
 Carmit Bachar as Waitress
 Don Guido as Club Owner
 Miranda Barrie as Burlesque Performer

Charts

References

External links 

 Sugar Daddy at IMDb

2018 songs
2000 singles
Macy Gray songs
Songs written by Macy Gray
Songs written by Meghan Trainor